International Standard IEC 60038, IEC standard voltages, defines a set of standard voltages for use in low voltage and high voltage AC and DC  electricity supply systems.

Low voltage 
Where two voltages are given below separated by "/", the first is the root-mean-square voltage between a phase and the neutral connector, whereas the second is the corresponding root-mean-square voltage between two phases (exception: the category shown below called "One Phase", where 240 V is the root-mean-square voltage between the two legs of a split phase). The three-phase voltages are for use in either four-wire (with neutral) or three-wire (without neutral) systems.

Three-phase 50 Hz 
 230 V / 400 V (formerly 220/380 V)
 400 V / 690 V (formerly 380/660 V)
 1000 V phase to phase (3 wire)

Suppliers using 220 V / 380 V or 240 V / 415 V systems were expected by the standard to migrate to the recommended value of 230 V / 400 V by the year 2003. This migration has already been largely completed, at least within the European Union.

Voltage conversion schedule

Three-phase 60 Hz 
 120 V / 208 V
 240 V
 230 V / 400 V
 277 V / 480 V
 480 V
 347 V / 600 V
 600 V / 1000 V

One-phase, three-wire 60 Hz (American split-phase) 
 120 V / 240 V

Table 3  1 kV to 35 kV 
Table 3 of IEC 60038 lists nominal voltages above 1 kV and not exceeding 35 kV. There are two series, one from 3 kV up to 35 kV and another one from 4.16 kV up to 34.5 kV.

Table 4 35 kV - 230 kV 
Table 4 shows nominal voltages above 35 kV and not exceeding 230 kV.

Table 5 245 - 1,200 kV  
Table 5 is systematically different, as the highest voltage for equipment is the characteristic value exceeding 245 kV. The enumeration begins at 300 kV and ends with 1200 kV.

See also 
 Mains electricity by country

References

External links 
 Definition of Voltage ranges as per IEC 60038 – WIKI - Electrical Installation Guide
 
 https://webstore.iec.ch/preview/info_iec60038%7Bed7.0%7Db.pdf 

Electric power distribution
60038
Electrical wiring